The 2018–19 Bundesliga was the 56th season of the Bundesliga, Germany's premier football competition. It began on 24 August 2018 and concluded on 18 May 2019. It also marked the first season without Hamburger SV, previously the only team to have played in the top tier of German football in every season since the end of World War I.

Following a trial phase in the previous season, the video assistant referee system was officially approved for use in the Bundesliga after being added to the Laws of the Game by IFAB.

Bayern Munich were the defending champions, and won their 28th Bundesliga title (and 29th German title) and seventh consecutive Bundesliga on the final matchday.

Teams

A total of 18 teams participated in the 2018–19 edition of the Bundesliga.

Team changes

Stadiums and locations

Personnel and kits

Managerial changes

League table

Results

Relegation play-offs
All times are CEST (UTC+2).

First leg

Second leg

2–2 on aggregate. Union Berlin won on away goals and are promoted to the Bundesliga, while VfB Stuttgart are relegated to the 2. Bundesliga.

Statistics

Top scorers

Hat-tricks

5 Player scored five goals

Clean sheets

Number of teams by state

Monthly awards

Goal of the year (2018) 
Jonas Hector won that award for his goal against Wolfsburg. He scored it for FC Köln.

References

Bundesliga seasons
1
Germany